Peled or Pelled (Hebrew: , "steel") may refer to:

People 
 Abe Peled, Israeli businessman
 Amit Peled
 Benny Peled (1928–2002), commander of the Israeli Air Force
 Doron A. Peled
 Efrat Peled
 Elad Peled (1927–2021), Israeli general
 Esther Peled, Israeli writer and psychologist
 Martin Peled-Flax
 Mattityahu Peled (1923–1995), senior Israeli military officer, scholar, and peace activist
 Micha Peled
 Miko Peled (born 1961), Israeli peace activist and author 
 Moshe Peled (disambiguation), multiple persons
 Natan Peled (1913–1992), Israeli politician
 Nurit Peled-Elhanan, Israeli peace activist, and daughter of Mattiyahu Peled
 Paulina Peled, nee Peisachov (born 1950), Israeli tennis player
 Sariel Har-Peled
 Yaron Peled
 Yossi Peled (born 1941), Israeli general and politician

See also